This is a list of flag bearers who have represented Portugal at the Olympics.

Flag bearers carry the national flag of their country at the opening ceremony of the Olympic Games.

See also
Portugal at the Olympics

References

Portugal at the Olympics
Portugal
Olympic flagbearers
Olympic flagbearers